Streptanthus polygaloides is a species of flowering plant in the mustard family known by the common name milkwort jewelflower. It is endemic to the Sierra Nevada foothills of California,  where it grows in woodlands and chaparral, generally on serpentine soils.

Description
Streptanthus polygaloides is quite variable in morphology. In general, it is an annual herb producing a hairless, sometimes waxy-textured stem under 10 centimeters to nearly one meter tall. The ephemeral basal leaves have blades divided into narrow segments and borne on petioles. Leaves higher on the stem have simple, linear blades up to 10 centimeters long which lack petioles. Flowers occur at intervals along the upper stem. Each has a folded, hooded, calyx of deeply keeled sepals in shades of greenish yellow to purple. Brown-veined white petals emerge from the tip. The fruit is a smooth, straight, flat or four-angled silique up to 5 centimeters in length.

Hyperaccumulator of nickel
The Streptanthus polygaloides  plant is a hyperaccumulator of nickel, with hyperaccumulation defined as the presence of at least 1,000 µg nickel per gram of dry mass. This species averages 2,430 to 18,600 µg/g. This trait helps protect the plant against many types of pathogens, including the powdery mildew Erysiphe polygoni, the bacterium Xanthomonas campestris, and the fungus Alternaria brassicola. It also helps defend the plant from leaf-chewing insects such as the red-legged grasshopper (Melanoplus femurrubrum) and the moth Evergestis rimosalis, and root-feeding insects like the cabbage maggot (Delia radicum). The high nickel levels in the plant have also been shown to protect it against the diamondback moth (Plutella xylostella). On the other hand, they do not affect all herbivorous insects that attack the plant, perhaps because some insects eat parts of the plant low in nickel, or can tolerate high-nickel diets, or include other, less toxic plant matter in their diets. In fact, some insects thrive on a high-nickel diet, such as the mirid bug Melanotrichus boydi, which specializes on this plant.

Phytoremediation
The plant's ability to draw relatively large amounts of nickel from the soil make it of interest as an agent of phytoremediation in soils polluted with heavy metals.

References

External links
Jepson Manual Treatment - Streptanthus polygaloides
Streptanthus polygaloides - Photo gallery

polygaloides
Endemic flora of California
Flora of the Sierra Nevada (United States)
Flora without expected TNC conservation status